William Howard (December 31, 1817 – June 1, 1891) was a United States Army soldier, lawyer, and a U.S. Representative from Ohio for one term from 1859 to 1861.

Early life and education 
Born in Jefferson County, Virginia, Howard attended public schools and later studied law. He was admitted to the bar in 1840 and subsequently established a law practice.

Military career 
He later moved to Batavia, Ohio, and served as a prosecuting attorney from 1845–1849. He served in the war with Mexico and was made second lieutenant of Company C, Second Regiment, Ohio Volunteer Infantry.

Following the war, he served as member of the Ohio Senate from 1849 to 1852.

Congress 
Howard was elected as a Democrat to the Thirty-sixth (March 4, 1859 – March 3, 1861). He was not a candidate for re-election.

Return to the military 
He enrolled in the army following the outbreak of the Civil War and was commissioned as the major of the 59th Ohio Infantry, on August 11, 1861. He was promoted to lieutenant colonel and commanded the regiment at the Battle of Stones River. Howard resigned his commission on February 24, 1863 and returned home to resume his law practice.

Later career and death 
Howard practiced law until his death in Batavia on June 1, 1891 at the age of 73. He was interred in the Batavia Union Cemetery.

References

 Retrieved on 2008-10-19

External links
 William Howard (1817–1891) entry at The Political Graveyard
 

1817 births
1891 deaths
Ohio lawyers
Democratic Party Ohio state senators
People from Batavia, Ohio
People from Jefferson County, West Virginia
People of Ohio in the American Civil War
People of West Virginia in the American Civil War
Union Army officers
American military personnel of the Mexican–American War
County district attorneys in Ohio
19th-century American politicians
19th-century American lawyers
Democratic Party members of the United States House of Representatives from Ohio